Daniele Altobelli (born 18 March 1993) is an Italian footballer who plays as a midfielder for  club Juve Stabia.

Career
He made his professional debut in the Lega Pro for Frosinone on 7 October 2012 in a game against Avellino.

On 2 September 2019, he joined Feralpisalò on loan.

On 3 October 2020, he signed a two-year contract with Catanzaro.

On 5 January 2021, he moved to Arezzo.

On 27 July 2021, he joined Juve Stabia.

References

External links
 

1993 births
Living people
People from Terracina
Footballers from Lazio
Italian footballers
Association football midfielders
Serie B players
Serie C players
Frosinone Calcio players
Ascoli Calcio 1898 F.C. players
F.C. Pro Vercelli 1892 players
U.S. Salernitana 1919 players
Ternana Calcio players
FeralpiSalò players
U.S. Catanzaro 1929 players
S.S. Arezzo players
S.S. Juve Stabia players
Sportspeople from the Province of Latina